Terence Malcolm Shakespeare (born 25 April 1950) is a former motorcycle speedway rider from England.

Born in West Bromwich, Shakespeare had a second half ride at Cradley Heath before making his league debut in 1969 with Long Eaton Rangers in the second division of the British League. After making his Division One debut in 1970 with Cradley Heathens, he had a longer run in the top flight in 1971 with Leicester Lions, averaging close to 4.5 from seven matches. Also in 1971, he finished runner-up in the Second Division Riders Championship. In 1972 he stepped up to the top division on a full-time basis with Leicester and by the end of the following season his average had risen to almost six points. In 1974 he transferred to Wolverhampton Wolves where he spent three seasons, before moving to Birmingham Brummies in 1977. In 1978 and 1979 he rode for Weymouth Wildcats. After missing the 1980 season he returned for a final season with Weymouth in 1981.

Shakespeare represented both England (19 caps) and Great Britain (1 cap) at National League level.

References

1950 births
Living people
British speedway riders
English motorcycle racers
Sportspeople from West Bromwich
Long Eaton Archers riders
Wolverhampton Wolves riders
Leicester Lions riders
Birmingham Brummies riders
Weymouth Wildcats riders
Hackney Hawks riders
Cradley Heathens riders
Stoke Potters riders